Ham chim peng, also spelt hum chim peng, known in Singapore and Malaysia as haam ji peng, hum ji peng, or ham ji peng, is a deep-fried hollow doughnut of Chinese origin. Commonly eaten as a breakfast food, it is sometimes fried with a coating of sesame seeds.

There are at least 3 varieties of ham chin peng - with glutinous rice, five spice powder and red bean paste.

See also

 List of doughnut varieties
 List of fried dough varieties
Beignet

Other Chinese fried dough dishes
Ox-tongue pastry
Shuangbaotai
Youtiao

References

Cantonese cuisine
Malaysian cuisine
Singaporean cuisine
Chinese doughnuts
Cantonese words and phrases